David Kopp (born 5 January 1979, in Bonn) is a former German road racing cyclist, who competed as a professional between 2001 and 2011. Kopp's speciality was sprinting and the cobbled classics of Belgium.

He did not get a contract for 2009.

In March 2009, it was announced that he tested positive for Cocaine during a National event in Belgium on 11 September 2008.

In February 2010, it was announced that Kopp will ride for the Team Kuota–Indeland on a one-year contract for 2010.

He now (2016) works in the fuel retail industry.

Major results

1997
  U19 Road Race Champion
2001
 Rund um den Henninger Turm U23
 FBD Insurance Rás, stages 3 & 8
 Circuito Montañés, stage 3
2004
 Giro del Capo, stage 2
 Rund um Düren
 Sparkassen Giro
 Grote Prijs Stad Zottegem – Dr. Tistaert Prijs

2005
 Giro del Capo, stage 1
 Rund um Köln
 Bayern Rundfahrt – 3rd stage: Dillingen – Erlangen
2006
 Trofeo Calvià
 Tour of Benelux, stage 6
 4th, stage 5 2006
 2nd, Gent–Wevelgem
 2nd, Rund um Köln
2007
 Tour de Pologne, stage 3
2008
 2nd, E3 Prijs Vlaanderen

References

External links
 Palmares on trap-friis

1979 births
Living people
German male cyclists
Sportspeople from Bonn
Cyclists from North Rhine-Westphalia